TV3 was a television channel in Slovenia owned by Modern Times Group (MTG). The channel was eventually suspended on 1 November 2004, but it were later relaunched on 1 October 2006.

On 3 June 2008, TV3 began broadcasting in Slovenian digital terrestrial television network and it was disconnected on 1 September 2008.

History
The station began as TV3 on 24 December 1995. Majority ownership was originally held by the Roman Catholic Church, and much of the initial programming was faith-oriented.

TV3 encountered poor ratings and financial losses from its outset. On 13 February 2003, Ivan Caleta, a businessman from Croatia, purchased 75% ownership of TV3 then proceeded to offer more popular programming. Viewership in 2004 increased  but remained a distant fifth place behind other free-to-air television services in Slovenia.

On 1 November 2004, the channel was shutdown and Prva TV began to use its frequencies. Later, on 1 July 2006, the channel was bought by Swedish media company Modern Times Group, and from 1 October 2006, the channel were relaunched, this time in reference to the Modern Times Group corporate brand TV3 Viasat.

On 29 February 2012, it ceased broadcasting due to uncompetitive environment and unresponsiveness of Slovenian authorities. It would become a new channel named Pink Si, now owned by Pink.

Distribution
TV3 was distributed terrestrially and via third party cable TV, DTH and IPTV networks.

Programming

Nationally created shows

Internationally Created Series

Internationally Created Animated Series

References

External links
 Official Site

Defunct television channels in Slovenia
Modern Times Group
Mass media in Ljubljana
Television channels and stations established in 1995
Television channels and stations disestablished in 2012
1995 establishments in Slovenia
2012 disestablishments in Slovenia